The 2014 PGA Tour Latinoamérica was the third season of PGA Tour Latinoamérica, having converted from the Tour de las Américas which ceased to operate in 2012. PGA Tour Latinoamérica is operated and run by the PGA Tour.

Schedule changes
The number of tournaments increased from 14 to 18, events added to the schedule included: Stella Artois Open, Lexus Panama Classic, Ecuador Open, TransAmerican Power Products CRV Mazatlán Open and Bridgestone America's Golf Cup. The Puerto Rico Classic was dropped from the schedule having previously been played in both the 2012 and 2013 seasons.

Schedule
The following table lists official events during the 2014 season.

Unofficial events
The following events were sanctioned by the PGA Tour Latinoamérica, but did not carry official money, nor were wins official.

Order of Merit
The Order of Merit was based on prize money won during the season, calculated in U.S. dollars. The top five players on the tour earned status to play on the 2015 Web.com Tour.

Developmental Series
The following table lists Developmental Series events during the 2014 season.

See also
2014 in golf

Notes

References

PGA Tour Latinoamérica
PGA Tour Latinoamerica